You're Gone may refer to:

"You're Gone" (Diamond Rio song), 1998
"You're Gone" (Marillion song), 2004
You're Gone, song by Del Amitri on Waking Hours album

See also 
If You're Gone (disambiguation)
When You're Gone (disambiguation)